Brenda Murphy is an Irish playwright.

Life
Brenda Murphy was born in west Belfast in 1954. She was the eldest of 10 siblings but never knew her father. He was married to another woman who lived nearby with his own family.  As a teenager she joined the Provisional Irish Republican Army, was convicted of having guns and spent several years in jail.  She gave birth to her first child while in prison.

Work
She has written a series of plays often set in working class Belfast which deal with contemporary issues such as the Troubles.  She has often worked in collaboration with the Brassneck Theatre Company. Her plays have been performed at the Edinburgh Festival.

Plays
 Binlids: the Story of West Belfast Resistance
 Forced Upon Us
 Working-class Heroes 
 Two Sore Legs
 A Night With George 
 Baby it's cold outside
 ˜Crazy

See also
 List of Irish writers

References

Irish dramatists and playwrights
Writers from Belfast
1954 births
Living people